The Ambassador Extraordinary and Plenipotentiary of the Russian Federation to the Islamic Republic of Iran is the official representative of the President and the Government of the Russian Federation to the President and the Government of Iran.

The ambassador and his staff work at large in the Embassy of Russia in Tehran. There are consulates general in Isfahan and Rasht. The post of Russian Ambassador to Iran is currently held by Alexey Dedov, incumbent since 8 September 2022.

History of diplomatic relations

Diplomatic relations between Russia and Iran date back to the medieval period, with the first visit of an envoy from Persia to the Grand Duchy of Moscow being recorded in 1592. The first Russian ambassador, Artemy Volynsky, was appointed in 1715, during the reign of Peter the Great. Following the Russian Revolution in 1917, diplomatic relations were briefly broken off, but were soon re-established, between Persia and at first the Russian Soviet Federative Socialist Republic, and later the Soviet Union. Following the dissolution of the Soviet Union in 1991, the incumbent Soviet ambassador, Vladimir Gudev, continued as representative of the Russian Federation until 1993.

List of representatives (1715 – present)

Representatives of the Tsardom of Russia to Persia (1715 – 1721)

Representatives of the Russian Empire to Persia (1721 – 1917)

Representatives of the Russian Provisional Government to Persia (March 1917 - unaccredited after October 1917)

Representatives of the Russian Soviet Federative Socialist Republic to Persia (1921 - 1923)

Representatives of the Union of Soviet Socialist Republics to Persia/Iran (1923 - 1991)

Representatives of the Russian Federation to Iran (1991 - present)

See also 
 Foreign relations of Iran
 Foreign relations of Russia

References

External links 
http://www.rusdiplomats.narod.ru/iran.html
https://web.archive.org/web/20120429141047/http://www.knowbysight.info/6_MID/00258.asp

Ambassadors of Russia to Iran
Iran
Russia